Breitenbrunner Laber is a river of Bavaria, Germany. It is formed at the confluence of the Wissinger Laber and the Bachhaupter Laber in Breitenbrunn. It flows into the Weiße Laber near Dietfurt.

See also
List of rivers of Bavaria

References

Rivers of Bavaria
Rivers of Germany